This is a list of properties and districts in Lee County, Georgia that are listed on the National Register of Historic Places (NRHP).

Current listings

|}

References

Lee
Buildings and structures in Lee County, Georgia